SRJC may refer to:

Santa Rosa Junior College, a public community college in Santa Rosa, California
Serangoon Junior College, a former junior college in Hougang, Singapore, now merged into Anderson Serangoon Junior College